The City of Redcliffe is a former local government area in South East Queensland, Australia. In 2008 it was amalgamated with the Shires of Pine Rivers and Caboolture to create Moreton Bay Region. It is in the northern part of the County of Stanley, with a total area of 38.1 km² and a population of 51,174.

Suburbs
The City of Redcliffe included the following suburbs:

 Redcliffe
 Clontarf
 Kippa-Ring
 Margate
 Newport
 Rothwell
 Scarborough
 Woody Point

History

Caboolture Division was created on 11 November 1879 as one of 74 divisions around Queensland under the Divisional Boards Act 1879. It was centred on Caboolture, which was at that time a small logging town, and initially covered all of Moreton Bay and much of the Sunshine Coast, but by 1890 had shrunk considerably with the separate incorporation of the Pine Division (21 January 1888), Redcliffe Division (5 April 1888) and Maroochy Division (5 July 1890).

Redcliffe Division became the Shire of Redcliffe on 31 March 1903 after the Local Authorities Act 1902 was enacted. On 28 May 1921 it became the Town of Redcliffe.

In June 1952 Keitha Drake was elected as the first female member of the Redcliffe local government. Her reason for standing for election was to get a hospital for Redcliffe's growing population. The first Redcliffe Hospital opened in 1961.

On 13 June 1959 the Town of Redcliffe became the City of Redcliffe.

On 27 June 2007 the Queensland Government's Local Government Reform Commission recommended the City of Redcliffe merge with neighbouring Shire of Pine Rivers and Shire of Caboolture, to become the Moreton Bay Region. This came into effect on 15 March 2008, under the Local Government (Reform Implementation) Act 2007 passed by the Parliament of Queensland on 10 August 2007.

Council structure
The Redcliffe City Council consisted of one Mayor and seven councillors.  The mayor and councillors represented the entire city, elected every four years by popular vote.

Council services

The Council had an annual budget of approximately $65 million (2005/06) with works involving such areas as road maintenance and construction, community, cultural and youth activities, town planning and development, water and sewerage, waste management and recycling, maintenance of parks and public areas, library services, public health and animal control, and business and tourism support.

Chairmen and mayors
 1888: Edmund MacDonnell
 1906: P. P. Fewings 
 1908: E.F. Morgan 
 1927: J. B. Dunn 
 1930–1943: Alfred Henry Langdon
 1943 - Joseph Hendry Grice
 1946–1949?: Robert Thomas (Bob) Bradley
 1955–1964: Jim Houghton
1991 - 1997: Barry Bolton
1998 - 2008: Alan Sutherland (first mayor of the Moreton Bay Region)

Sister cities
Redcliffe City Council, on behalf of the City of Redcliffe, has two Sister City arrangements:
  – Sanyō-Onoda, Yamaguchi*
  – Winton, Queensland*
Sister City arrangements in doubt under Moreton Bay Regional Council.

Surrounding local government areas
Redcliffe is immediately north of Brisbane's area, connected from Clontarf to Brighton via the historic Hornibrook Bridge and Houghton Highway.  Shire of Pine Rivers is to the south-west of the peninsula, and Shire of Caboolture to the north-west.

References

External links
 
Local Government Directory – Redcliffe City Council profile

Former local government areas of Queensland
2008 disestablishments in Australia
Populated places disestablished in 2008